Frammia is a genus of trilobites in the order Phacopida that existed during the middle and upper Silurian in what is now the Arctic regions of Canada and Russia. It was described by Holtedahl in 1914, and the type species is Frammia dissimilis. That species was subsequently considered to be a synonym of Frammia arctica (Salter, 1852). The genus also contains the species, F. bachae Adrain & Edgecombe, 1997, F. hyperborea (Thomas, 1979), and F. rossica (Maksimova, 1970). The type locality is the Douro Formation of Cornwallis Island in Nunavut, Canadian Arctic.

References

External links
 Frammia at the Paleobiology Database

Encrinuridae genera
Fossil taxa described in 1914
Silurian trilobites of North America
Fossils of Canada
Paleontology in Nunavut
Paleozoic life of the Northwest Territories
Silurian Canada

pl:Frammia